Bibleland is the eleventh album by Christian alternative rock band Daniel Amos, released in 1994 by BAI Records. The album is unusual for its loud, distorted noise pop sound, atypical of the band's other recordings.

The title song mocks cheap religious merchandise in the form of a fictional Amusement Park (although based on several real parks) called "Bibleland." The album's artwork includes a "Circus" style gatefold illustration by Douglas TenNapel.

Track listing
 "Broken Ladders to Glory" (words and music by Taylor)
 "Bibleland" (words and music by Taylor)
 "Theo's Logic" (words and music by Taylor)
 "Low Crawls and High Times" (words and music by Taylor)
 "Bakersfield" (words and music by Taylor)
 "Out in the Cold" (words and music by Taylor)
 "The Bubble Bursts" (words and music by Taylor)
 "Pete and Repeat" (words and music by Taylor)
 "Constance of the Universe" (words and music by Taylor)
 "I'll Get Over It" (words and music by Taylor)
 "She's Working Here" (words and music by Taylor)
 "Stone Away" (words by Taylor, music by Taylor/Chandler/McTaggart)

Credits 

 Jerry Chamberlain — guitars
 Tim Chandler — bass guitar, rhythm guitar on "Bibleland"
 Greg Flesch — guitars
 Ed McTaggart — drums
 Terry Scott Taylor — rhythm guitars, lead vocals, engineer

Additional musicians
 Gene Eugene — piano on "I'll Get Over It", executive producer, engineer, mixing

Production notes
 Ojo Taylor – executive producer
 The Green Room, Huntington Beach, California – recording location
 Mixing Lab A – mixing location
 The Green Room – mixing location
 Doug Doyle – mastering
 Digital Brothers – mastering location
 Tom Gulotta – art direction, design, photography, digital editing
 Court Patton – art direction, design, photography, digital editing
 Patton Brothers Design, San Diego, California – art direction, design, photography, digital editing
 Ed McTaggart at the Color Edge, Costa Mesa, California – scanning, color proofing, film output
 Trisha Kluck – band photo
 Doug TenNapel – illustrations

References 

1994 albums
Albums with cover art by Doug TenNapel
Daniel Amos albums